Henry Hering (born 28 January 1968) is a Canadian rower. He competed at the 1992 Summer Olympics, 1996 Summer Olympics and the 2000 Summer Olympics.

References

External links
 

1968 births
Living people
Canadian male rowers
Olympic rowers of Canada
Rowers at the 1992 Summer Olympics
Rowers at the 1996 Summer Olympics
Rowers at the 2000 Summer Olympics
People from Pointe-Claire
Sportspeople from Quebec
Pan American Games medalists in rowing
Pan American Games silver medalists for Canada
Pan American Games bronze medalists for Canada
Rowers at the 1995 Pan American Games
20th-century Canadian people